Loïc Serra is a French Formula One engineer. He is currently the performance director at the Mercedes AMG Petronas Motorsport Formula One team.

Career
Serra studied at Arts et Métiers ParisTech in Aix-en-Provence and Paris, specialising in Mechanical Engineering.

After graduating from university, Serra started his career in motorsport with Michelin, working as a quality engineer in Bad Kreuznach, Germany, before moving to the company's main Research and Development centre in Clermont-Ferrand, France. His department worked on new tyres and suspension concepts allowing Serra to gain a deep understanding in vehicle dynamics and tyre interactions.

In 2002, Serra was given the task to develop a new innovative suspension system for racing cars and other high-performance vehicles. This suspension system was proposed to the Michelin customer teams in Formula One and formed Serra's first encounter with the series. Shortly afterwards, Serra joined the F1 department at Michelin and remained there until the tyre manufacturer withdrew from the series in 2006.

However, Serra wished to stay in Formula One, so he joined the BMW Sauber F1 Team to become the Head of Vehicle Performance for the Swiss team. After BMW's withdrawal from Formula One, Serra decided to seek a new challenge so he joined the new Mercedes works team where he has remained ever since.

In 2019, Serra was promoted to Performance Director at Mercedes. His role involves working with tyre, suspension, aerodynamic and Power Unit experts to ensure the various characteristics work towards an overall package that is both fast and reliable.

References

1972 births
Living people
21st-century French engineers
Formula One engineers
Sauber Motorsport
Mercedes-Benz in Formula One